Atractaspis engaddensis, also known as "שרף עין גדי" (in Hebrew, pronounced "Saraf Ein Gedi") or "الأسود الخبيث" (in Arabic, pronounced "al'aswad alkhabith") is a venomous snake found in Egypt (Sinai Peninsula),  Israel, Jordan, Lebanon, and Saudi Arabia. The specific epithet references the type locality, Ein Gedi on the western shore of the Dead Sea.

Description
It is an extremely venomous and a dangerous snake native to the Middle East. Its body is usually dark black in color and it has small eyes with round pupils. The head and the tail are short and pointy which makes it harder even for veterans to distinguish head from tail. Its approximate size is 60–80 cm. This snake's fangs are able to be directed outside of its mouth, granting it the ability to side stab with a closed mouth.

Feeding
They prefer hatchling snakes but they can also eat small mammals like young rodents.

Venom

"Three isotoxins, named sarafotoxins S6a1, S6b and S6c, with strong cardiotoxic activity were isolated from the venom of this snake. All three sarafotoxins are homologous peptides (four or less than four residue replacements) consisting of 21 amino acid residues. Their structure and activity are novel among snake venom components."
"The venom has a very high lethal potency, with an i.v. LD50 of 0.06-0.075 micrograms per g body weight in mice. The action of the venom is rapid and death results from seemingly neurotoxic effects. However, even at high concentrations, the venom does not block contractions of skeletal muscles that are directly or indirectly stimulated. The most prominent action of the venom is seen in the function of the heart in anesthetized mice, with or without artificial respiration. The changes observed in the ECG are similar to those recorded in human victims and are the result of an A-V block that is caused by an apparent direct action of the venom on the heart."

References

External links

Atractaspididae
Reptiles described in 1950
Reptiles of the Middle East
Snakes of Jordan
Fauna of Jordan
Reptiles of the Arabian Peninsula
Fauna of Lebanon